Denis Franklin Pinto Saavedra (born August 25, 1995 in Costa Rica) was a Costa Rican but changed his nationality to Bolivian. He's currently a footballer who since 2011 has played forward for Blooming.

Club career statistics

International career
Pinto was summoned to the Bolivian U-20 team to play in the 2015 South American Youth Football Championship.

References

External links
 
 Denis Franklin Pinto Saavedra at Soccerpunter
 

1995 births
Living people
Naturalized citizens of Bolivia
Association football forwards
Bolivian footballers
Costa Rican footballers
Club Blooming players
Club Real Potosí players
Bolivia youth international footballers